Tuulos is a Finnish surname. Notable people with the surname include:

Kalle Tuulos (1930–2001), Finnish figure skater
Vilho Tuulos (1895–1967), Finnish triple jumper, uncle of Kalle

Finnish-language surnames